Jemma House (born 2 November 1996) is an Australian soccer player who last played for the Newcastle Jets.

Early life
House grew up in Kurri Kurri, New South Wales and attended Hunter Sports High School in Gateshead where she excelled in Football winning the school's Women's Football Player of the Year in 2014.

Club career
After a number of years playing College soccer in the United States where House had become known for being a prolific goal scorer, she returned to her hometown of Newcastle in 2019 where the striker successfully trialled with Women's Premier League side Newcastle Olympic FC.

In 2020 House scored 33 goals in 16 games as Olympic won both the Premiership and Championship in their maiden season in the league. In the Grand Final she scored a brace as the club beat Warners Bay FC 3–2 and was named Player of the Match, House was later awarded Player of the Season and the Golden Boot for the WPL.

After her impressive season in the local league Newcastle Jets manager Ash Wilson signed House for the upcoming 2020–21 season. House played ten matches across the season and re-signed with the club for the following season.

Career statistics

References

External links 
 

1996 births
Living people
People from Maitland, New South Wales
Sportswomen from New South Wales
Soccer players from New South Wales
Women's association football forwards
Australian women's soccer players
Nova Southeastern Sharks women's soccer players
Wyoming Cowgirls soccer players
Newcastle Jets FC (A-League Women) players
A-League Women players
Australian expatriate women's soccer players
Australian expatriate sportspeople in the United States
Expatriate soccer players in the United States